Transnistria is a region in Eastern Europe that is under the effective control of the self-declared Pridnestrovian Moldavian Republic but is recognized by the international community as an administrative unit of Moldova, the Administrative-Territorial Units of the Left Bank of the Dniester. 

The Pridnestrovian Moldavian Republic uses a red-green-red triband and the Administrative-Territorial Units of the Left Bank of the Dniester use the flag of Moldova.

Pridnestrovian Moldavian Republic

The Pridnestrovian Moldavian Republic, also known as Transnistria (Moldovan Cyrillic: Стягул Транснистрией;), has two co-official national flags. The first co-official national flag consists of three horizontal bands of red, green, and red, of vertical width 3:2:3, and in the upper canton, is the main element of the coat of arms of Transnistria; a golden hammer and sickle and a gold-bordered red star. The hammer and sickle fit into a conventional square, and the star, a conditional circle. Transnistria adopted this design that comprises a version of the flag of the Moldavian Soviet Socialist Republic used between 1952 and 1990 in the 2000 Law about State Symbols. The second co-official national flag consists of three horizontal stripes in the colors white, blue, and red. (Russian flag at a ratio of 1:2 instead of 2:3)

History 
The flag of the Moldavian Soviet Socialist Republic served as the flag of the republic until December 1991. When Moldova became independent, some places in Transnistria refused to fly the new Moldovan flag and continued to fly the flag of the Soviet Union. Continued use of the flag of the former Moldavian SSR was popular and it was officially reintroduced as the flag of Transnistria in 1991. Despite the socialist influence on the flag and coat of arms, Transnistria is not a socialist state. It is the only state in the world that uses the hammer and sickle on its flag.

The original flag, as well as its description, are kept in the official residence of the President of Transnistria.

In 2009, the Supreme Council discussed a proposal to replace the civil flag – which is plain red-green-red without the hammer and sickle – with a new flag, carrying three horizontal stripes in the colours white, blue, and red, being almost identical to the flag of the Russian Federation, but with a different aspect ratio (1:2 instead of Russia's 2:3). The primary reason for the co-official national flag is that it indicates Transnistria's desire for closer ties with Russia, a guarantor of Transnistria's claimed independence from Moldova. In a 2006 referendum, 97.2% of Transnistrians were reported to have voted in favour of increased free association with Russia. The new flag is used alongside the state flag. In 2017, the Supreme Council passed a motion making the new design Transnistria's co-official national flag.

Usage 
Transnistrian law permits the use of a simplified version of the flag for non-governmental use (personal and commercial usage) without the hammer and sickle and red star and regard to shape or size. The most common size is still 1:2, but 2:3 versions have also been used.

The national flag of Transnistria is permanently raised on the buildings of:

Other flags 
The presidential flag is a 1:1, yellow fringed version of the civil flag with the coat-of-arms in the center. It was adopted on 18 July 2000 and replaced an earlier version dating from 1997.

The army flag is a blue flag with a yellow bordered red cross. It is similar to that of the Moldovan army, but does not include the Moldovan coat-of-arms.

A customs flag is also in use by Transnistrian customs. It is a primarily green flag with two red bands at the bottom. The central part of the flag is dominated by the symbol of Transnistrian customs.

Administrative-Territorial Units of the Left Bank of the Dniester 
The law which formally established the Administrative-Territorial Units of the Left Bank of the Dniester contains provisions for the region to adopt its own symbols. At present, the region has not yet adopted a distinctive flag and instead of the flag of Moldova is used for official purposes. It consists of a vertical tricolor of blue, yellow, and red, charged with the coat of arms of Moldova (an eagle holding a shield charged with an aurochs) on the center bar.

See also 
 Coat of arms of Transnistria
 Flag of the Moldavian Soviet Socialist Republic
 Flag of Moldova
 Flag of Gagauzia

References

External links 
 About the State Flag of the Pridnestrovian Moldavian Republic
 Parliament's website for law on state flag 

Politics of Transnistria
Flags of Moldova
Transnistria
Transnistria
Transnistria